Laïla Aziz (born 1 May 1981) is a Los Angeles-based Dutch-Moroccan fashion designer. She is a creative designer at ‘Kayat’, a fashion brand that designs modern-day outfits for women.

Early life
Laïla Aziz was born and raised in the Netherlands to a Moroccan family. She had a passion for fashion and sketched outfits while growing up. In her younger years, her mother was against the idea of her studying fashion. Instead, both of her parents wanted her to focus on her education and pursue a career in law as they thought fashion would not provide a stable future. She pursued her degree in law and then married Nadir Khayat, a Moroccan record producer, singer and songwriter, popularly known by his stage name: RedOne. After their marriage, the couple moved to New York, where Laila took a one year course in fashion and started working as a stylist.

Career
Aziz resides in Morocco and the United States with her husband. Her first collection was successful, despite criticism from the fashion industry as too "Arabic" for the American market. The inspiration behind her designs have been the places she has visited. Aziz has a special connection with the United Arab Emirates, as she believes that the country has an amazing multiculturalism, which is reflected in her work. Her fashion collection was featured in Vogue's 2018 "Autumn/Winter Ready-To-Wear" collection. Kayat's Summer-Spring collection were included in 2020 Arab Fashion Week.

Personal life
Laïla married Nadir Khayat, who is popularly known as RedOne, in 2006.

References

External links
 
 

1981 births
Living people
Dutch people of Moroccan descent
Moroccan expatriates in the United States
Dutch fashion designers
Dutch women fashion designers
Costume designers
High fashion brands